The Danish Figure Skating Championships are the figure skating national championships held annually to crown the national champions of Denmark. Skaters compete in the disciplines of men's singles, ladies' singles, pair skating, and ice dancing, across different levels. Not every event has been held in every year due to a lack of entries.

The competition is organized by the Dansk Skøjte Union. It was held outdoors in the first half of the 20th century, and was therefore subject to the weather conditions; it was not held during the warmer winters.

Senior medalists

Men

Ladies

Pairs

Ice dancing

Junior medalists

Men

Ladies

Pairs

Ice dancing

Novice medalists

Boys

Girls

References

External links
 Danish Skating Union
 more info
 2007 Championships
 2008 Championships

 
Figure skating in Denmark
Figure skating national championships